Orel Grinfeld (born 21 August 1981) is an Israeli football referee. He has been on the FIFA list of international referees since 2012, and took charge of his first international matches in March that year, officiating in two Group 1 matches in the 2012 UEFA European Under-17 Championship elite round. He has since gone on to referee senior matches, making his debut in the UEFA Europa League group stage in 2015–16. He made his UEFA Champions League debut in a 2018–19 group stage game between Real Madrid and Viktoria Plzeň. In 2019–20 season, he became the first Israeli referee to officiate a game in the UEFA Champions League knockout stage, in a last 16 game between Lazio and Bayern Munich.

UEFA Euro 2020
This was Grinfeld's first appearance at a major tournament. 
Grinfeld refereed the Netherlands–Austria (Group C) match.

See also
List of football referees
List of Jews in sports (non-players)

References

External links
Profile at WorldReferee.com

1981 births
Living people
Israeli football referees
UEFA Euro 2020 referees
People from Kiryat Yam